A list of films produced in Brazil in 2002 (see 2002 in film):

2002

See also
2002 in Brazil
2002 in Brazilian television

2002
Films
Brazil